The 2014 Tour Femenino de San Luis was a stage race held in San Luis Province in Argentina, with a UCI rating of 2.2, from 14 January to 18 January. It was the first race of the 2014 Women's Elite cycling calendar and mirrored the men's cycling event, the Tour de San Luis.

Teams
UCI Women's Teams:
UnitedHealthcare Women's Team

National Teams:
Nova School of Cycling
Acimproba-Orbai
Roberto Cycling School Braghette
Brunetta Bike
Metro Xilium
Punta Indio Adventure
Stemax Sports
Bicimania
Female Team SL
Team Mercedes SL
MTB Team
CFP Competition
Colombian National Team
Clos de Pirque-Trek
Cuban National Team
Brazilian National Team
Funvic Team

Stages

Stage 1
14 January 2014 – Villa Mercedes to Villa Mercedes,

Stage 2
15 January 2014 – Merlo to Merlo,

Stage 3
16 January 2014 – El Durazno to El Durazno,

Stage 4
17 January 2014 – Juana Koslay,  individual time trial (ITT)

Stage 5
18 January 2014 – San Luis to San Luis,

Jerseys
Source:
 denotes the overall race leader
 denotes the highest placed rider who is under 23 years of age
 denotes the combination classification leader
 denotes he leader of the sprint competition
 denotes the highest placed Argentinian rider

Classification leadership

References

External links

See also
2014 in women's road cycling

2014 in women's road cycling
Cycle races in Argentina
Women's road bicycle races
2014 in Argentine women's sport
Sport in San Luis Province